The Christian National Union Confederation (CNG) was a trade union federation bringing together Christian democratic trade unions in Switzerland.

History
The federation was founded in 1907, as the Christian Social Union Federation of Switzerland, with about 4,500 members.  After almost collapsing, it began co-operating with the Swiss Trade Union Federation during World War I, but withdrew this in 1918 due to it opposition to the possibility of a general strike.  It spread into Romandy from 1916, and Ticino from 1918.  In 1921, it renamed itself as the CNG, and grew steadily, reaching 36,000 members by 1941, 84,000 in 1961, and peaking at 116,000 in 1990.  While the federation was open to all Christians, the vast majority of members were Catholics, with some Protestants instead forming the Swiss Association of Protestant Workers.

During the 1990s, the federation's affiliates rapidly lost members, and by 1997, it was down to 93,100.  In 2002, it merged with the Confederation of Swiss Employees' Associations, to form Travail.Suisse.

Affiliates

References

Christian trade unions
Trade unions in Switzerland
Trade unions established in 1907
Trade unions disestablished in 2002